Pablo Cumo (1898–1992) was an Argentine stage and film actor. Cumo appeared in around fifty films during his career.

Selected filmography
 Santos Vega (1936)
 His Best Student (1944)
 Savage Pampas (1945)
 Where Words Fail (1946)
 Juan Moreira (1948)
 My Poor Beloved Mother (1948)
 Story of a Bad Woman (1948)
 School of Champions (1950)
 The Honourable Tenant (1951)
 The Fan (1951)
 Juan Moreira (1973)

References

Bibliography 
 Etchelet, Raúl. Niní Marshall: (la biografía). La Crujía Ediciones, 2005.

External links 
 

1898 births
1992 deaths
Argentine male film actors
Argentine male stage actors
People from Buenos Aires
20th-century Argentine male actors